Ladislav Bačík (24 July 1933 – 6 January 2016) was a Slovak swimmer. He competed at the 1952 Summer Olympics and the 1956 Summer Olympics.

References

External links
 

1933 births
2016 deaths
Slovak male swimmers
Olympic swimmers of Czechoslovakia
Swimmers at the 1952 Summer Olympics
Swimmers at the 1956 Summer Olympics
Sportspeople from Piešťany